Batura Glacier,  long, is one of the largest and longest glaciers outside of the polar regions. It lies in the upper Hunza (Gojal) region of Hunza District, Gilgit-Baltistan in Pakistan. The glacier flows west to east. The lower portions can be described as a grey sea of rocks and gravelly moraine, bordered by a few summer villages and pastures with herds of sheep, goats, cows and yaks and where roses and juniper trees are common.

See also
Batura
Passu Sar
List of glaciers
Batura Muztagh

References

External links

 Northern Pakistan detailed placemarks in Google Earth

Glaciers of the Karakoram
Glaciers of Gilgit-Baltistan